Kasipul Kabondo Constituency was an electoral constituency in Kenya. It was one of two constituencies in Rachuonyo District. With the new constitution of 2010, the constituency was divided into Kasipul Constituency and Kabondo Constituency, both in Homa Bay County.

Members of Parliament 
 2013 || Silvance Osele || ODM ||
|}2017|| [Eve Obara
]]||ODM||

Locations and wards

References

External links 
 Kasipul Kabondo Constituency

Rachuonyo District
Constituencies in Nyanza Province
Former constituencies of Kenya